Murpheys Bluff is a mountain in South West Tasmania.  It lies on the North West end of the Frankland Range jutting out toward the East from the range toward the impoundment Lake Pedder.  It is directly East of The Citadel and North West of Cleft Peak.  It towers above Bluff Tarn to the North West.

See also
 Lake Pedder
 Strathgordon, Tasmania
 South West Wilderness, Tasmania

References
 Solitary 4224, Edition 1 2001, Tasmania 1:25000 Series, Tasmap

Mountains of Tasmania
South West Tasmania